The Mayor of Tshwane is the head of the local government of Pretoria, South Africa; currently that government takes the form of the City of Tshwane Metropolitan Municipality. In the past, the position of Mayor has varied between that of an executive mayor actively governing the city and that of a figurehead mayor with a mostly ceremonial role.

List of mayors of Tshwane

Historic office

Transvaal Republic - District of Pretoria (1857-1900)

British Transvaal Colony - Pretoria (1902 - 1910)

Union of South Africa - Pretoria (1910 - 1931)

Union of South Africa - City of Pretoria (1931-1961)
(Pretoria is declared a city on 14 October 1931)

Republic of South Africa - City of Pretoria (1961-1994)
(The Union is dissolved into an independent republic on 31 May 1961)

References

Mayors of Pretoria
City of Tshwane Metropolitan Municipality